The 2013 Paris–Tours was the 107th edition of this single day road bicycle racing event. John Degenkolb won the race from a mass sprint in front of Michael Mørkøv and Arnaud Démare.

General standings

References

External links
Official website

Paris
Paris–Tours
Paris-Tours
Paris-Tours